In US politics, Republican In Name Only is a pejorative used to describe politicians of the Republican Party deemed insufficiently loyal to the party, or misaligned with the party's ideology. Similar terms have been used since the early 1900s. The acronym RINO became popular in the 1990s, and both the acronym and the full spelling have become commonly used by former president Donald Trump and his supporters to refer to his critics within the Republican Party.

Origins
In 1912, former President Theodore Roosevelt, then-President William Howard Taft, and Senator Robert M. La Follette fought for ideological control of the Republican Party and each denounced the other two as "not really Republican." The phrase Republican in name only emerged as a popular political pejorative in the 1920s, 1950s, and 1980s.

The earliest known print appearance of the term RINO was in the Manchester, New Hampshire newspaper then called The Union Leader. It was invented so that it is abbreviated to "RINO", and pronounced to sound like "rhino".

Buttons featuring the red slash through an image of a rhinoceros were spotted in the New Hampshire State House as early as 1992.  In 1993, future California Republican Assembly President Celeste Greig distributed buttons featuring a red slash over the word RINO to express opposition to Los Angeles mayor Richard Riordan. The term came into widespread usage during subsequent election cycles.

Usage
During Republican primary campaign season, some conservative organizations target RINO Republicans who fail to adopt their stances. National Federation of Republican Assemblies started the "RINO Hunters' Club", whom they believe to be too moderate on such issues as taxes, gun rights, and abortion. The fiscally conservative 501(c)4 organization Club for Growth invented the "RINO Watch" list to monitor "Republican office holders around the nation who have advanced egregious anti-growth, anti-freedom or anti-free market policies"; other conservative groups published similar lists.

Donald Trump 

Donald Trump has frequently used the term to describe his critics within the Republican Party. During the 2020 presidential election in the United States, Donald Trump used the term to refer to Georgia governor, Brian Kemp, and Georgia Secretary of State, Brad Raffensperger, due to their refusal to challenge the election results in Georgia during the attempts to overturn the 2020 United States presidential election. He also used the term to refer to Maryland governor Larry Hogan in a tweet, as well as House and Senate Republicans who either voted to impeach and convict him during his second impeachment following the January 6 United States Capitol attack or who voted for the Bipartisan Infrastructure Bill supported by President Joe Biden. Recently, the term has been used to describe Republican critics of former President Donald Trump, with Trump himself tweeting that Congressional Republicans who recognized Joe Biden as the winner of the 2020 US Presidential election are RINOs. Some Republicans critical of Trump occasionally used the epithet to describe Trump himself.

After former Secretary of State Colin Powell died in 2021, Trump described him as a "classic RINO".

Similar terms
The concept of being an inauthentic member of the Republican Party by not representing its more conservative faction is a recurring theme in Party history.

Me-too Republicans

In the 1930s and 1940s, the term Me-too Republicans described those running on a platform of agreeing with the Democratic Party, proclaiming only minor or moderating philosophical differences. An example is two-time presidential candidate Thomas E. Dewey, who ran against the popular Franklin D. Roosevelt and his successor Harry Truman. Dewey did not oppose Roosevelt's New Deal programs altogether, but merely campaigned on the promise that Republicans would run them more efficiently and less corruptly.

From 1936 to 1976, the more centrist members of the Republican Party frequently won the national nomination with candidates such as Alf Landon, Wendell Willkie, Thomas E. Dewey, Dwight D. Eisenhower, Richard Nixon, and Gerald Ford. The mainstream of the Republican Party was generally supportive of the New Deal. In the 1950s, conservatives such as Robert A. Taft and Barry Goldwater, who rallied against "me-too Republicans", were considered outside of the mainstream; serious consideration was given to leaving the then GOP and forming a new ultra-conservative party in coalition with the "states' rights" Democrats of the South.

Nixonians and Rockefeller Republicans
In the 1960s and 1970s, Republicans considered liberal on domestic policy but hawkish on foreign policy were sometimes called "Nixonian", or "Rockefeller Republicans". The term Nixonian took on other meanings after the Watergate scandal.

Gypsy moth Republican
In the 1980s, the term gypsy moth Republican described Republicans from the Northeast and Midwest who voted against the Ronald Reagan administration's proposed cuts in aid to economically distressed people, contrasting with boll weevil Democrats, who voted for these cuts. The gypsy moth is an invasive species destructive to trees in the Northeastern United States.

Cuckservative
In 2015 the term cuckservative, a portmanteau of cuckold and conservative, was popularized on the online forum 4chan, and embraced by both internet trolls and the nativist alt-right. The metaphorical "" is represented in a genre of interracial pornography as a masochistic white husband who allows his wife to have sex with a stronger black man, thereby participating in his own symbolic emasculation. In white supremacist vernacular the term is an accusation of yielding to non-white interests on issues such as immigration or modern display of the Confederate flag; however, the term gained use (with some controversy) by more mainstream conservatives to denounce Republicans whose compromises included vote trading, rhetorical restraint in deference to donors, cooperation with Democrats on any particular initiative, or attempting to court voters by making appeals to supposedly liberal ideals.

See also
 Blue Dog Coalition
 A Call for American Renewal
 Libertarian Republican
 Rockefeller Republican
 Democrat in Name Only
 Half-Breeds (politics)
 Never Trump movement
 Ripon Society
 Republican Accountability Project
 Stalwart (politics)
 The Lincoln Project, a group of former Republicans critical of Trump
 Red Tory, a similar term applied to left-leaning Conservatives in Canada and the United Kingdom

References 

Criticism of neoconservatism
Republican Party (United States) terminology
1992 neologisms
Political slurs for people
Political terminology of the United States
Political metaphors referring to people